Haripada Datta (born 1947) is a Bangladeshi novelist. He is one of the winners of the 2006 Bangla Academy Literary Award.

Datta was born 2 January 1947 in Khanepur village, British India (now in Palash Upazila, Narsingdi District, Bangladesh).

Bibliography 

Short Story collections
 Surjer Ghrane Phera (1985)
 Joal Bangar Pala (1985)

Novels
 Eshane Ognidaho [Conflagration in the North-East] (1986)
 Ondhokupe Jonmothsob [Birth Ceremony in the Black Hole] (1987)
 Ojogor [A Boa] (1989 and 1991)
 Jonmo-Jonmantor [Birth and Rebirth] (2000)
 Drabirgram (2003)

Awards
 Sada't Ali Akanda Literary prize (2001)
 Bangla Academy Literary Award (2006)

References

External links
 Haripada Datta Examines Human Mind and Society in Political Perspective at Bangladeshinovels.com

1947 births
Bangladeshi male novelists
Living people
Recipients of Bangla Academy Award
People from Palash Upazila